The Falkland Islands general election of 1952 was held in May and June 1952 to elect members to the Legislative Council. Four out of the twelve Councillors were elected through universal suffrage, two from Stanley and one each from East Falkland and West Falkland. Owing to the remoteness of some settlements and the unpredictability of the weather on the Falkland Islands, the election took place over several days.

Results
Candidates in italic were incumbents.

References

1952 elections in South America
1952
General election
Non-partisan elections
May 1952 events in South America
June 1952 events in South America
1952 elections in the British Empire